Ferdinand Joseph Meinolph Anton Maria Freiherr von Lüninck (3 August 1888 – 14 November 1944) was a German landowner and officer.

Born at the family estate Haus Ostwig, in Ostwig, Province of Westphalia, Ferdinand Freiherr von Lüninck was married to Auguste Freiin von Gaugreben-Schönau, with whom he had two daughters and three sons.

Ferdinand Freiherr von Lüninck studied law and eventually adopted a career in government. After the First World War, he was until 1922 District Administrator (Landrat) in Neuss. Later, after his father's death, he moved back to his family home to administer the estate, and became active in the Westphalia Landwirtschaftskammer, a body representing and regulating matters relating to rural interests and forests. Within the German National People's Party (Deutschnationale Volkspartei; DNVP) he first supported the course that the Nazis were taking. From 1933 to 1938, he was the premier (Oberpräsident) of the Province of Westphalia, and until 1943, he was in the military as a battalion commander in Potsdam. He was then involved in the plans to overthrow Hitler on 20 July 1944, after having met Carl Friedrich Goerdeler and Fritz-Dietlof von der Schulenburg in Berlin in 1943. He was foreseen as Political Commissioner for Defence District XX (Danzig, nowadays Gdańsk, Poland). He was arrested on 25 July 1944, after the plot failed. He was sentenced at the Volksgerichtshof on 13 November 1944 to death and hanged at Plötzensee Prison in Berlin the next day.

Notes

External links 

 Short biography
 Lünincks Works in the Landwirtschaftskammer
 Plötzensee Prison
 

1888 births
1944 deaths
People from Hochsauerlandkreis
Executed members of the 20 July plot
German National People's Party politicians
German Army officers of World War II
People condemned by Nazi courts
People from North Rhine-Westphalia executed by Nazi Germany
People from the Province of Westphalia
People executed by hanging at Plötzensee Prison
Barons of Germany
Von Lüninck family
Provincial Presidents of Westphalia